Faido railway station is a railway station in the Swiss canton of Ticino and municipality of Faido. The station is on the original line of the Swiss Federal Railways Gotthard railway, on the southern ramp up to the Gotthard Tunnel. Most trains on the Gotthard route now use the Gotthard Base Tunnel and do not pass through Faido station.

Services 
 the following services stop at Faido:

The station is also served by bus services operated by Autopostale, including an hourly service between Bellinzona and Airolo that parallels the railway line, together with other more local services.

References

External links 
 
 

Railway stations in Ticino
Swiss Federal Railways stations